Suttinan Nontee (born April 1, 1984) is a retired professional footballer from Thailand.

External links
Profile at Thaipremierleague.co.th
http://uk.soccerway.com/players/suttinan-nontee/288028/

1984 births
Living people
Suttinan Nontee
Association football midfielders
Suttinan Nontee
Suttinan Nontee
Suttinan Nontee
Suttinan Nontee
Suttinan Nontee
Suttinan Nontee
Suttinan Nontee
Suttinan Nontee
Suttinan Nontee
Suttinan Nontee